The Virginia State Treasurer is the head of the Virginia Department of the Treasury. They are the primary manager of the state's multi-billion dollar investment portfolio and oversee the issuance of bonds and management of debt in excess of $15 billion.

The current Virginia State Treasurer is David L. Richardson, who was appointed by Governor Glenn Youngkin in June 2022.

Partial list of Treasurers

External links
 Official Virginia Department of the Treasury web site

References